A Scout staff (or Scout stave) is a shoulder-high wooden pole or quarterstaff, traditionally carried by Boy Scouts as part of their accoutrements. Its main purpose was as a walking stick or Trekking pole, but it had a number of other uses in emergency situations and can be used for Scout pioneering.

History

When Robert Baden-Powell devised his scheme of Scout citizenship training for boys, published in 1908 in Scouting for Boys, he recommended that Scouts should carry "a strong stick, about as high as your nose, marked in feet and inches for measuring". After listing the various uses to which the staff could be put, he added "If you get the chance, cut your own staff, but remember to get permission first". It was said to have been based on a staff used by a Royal Engineers officer during the Fourth Anglo-Ashanti War. In August 1917, Baden-Powell wrote a critical article in the Headquarters Gazette about "the matter of Scouts being allowed to parade without their staffs, which for several reasons is regrettable". In the same article, he lists the cultural roots of the Scout staff which he claimed were "the scouts of Cuhulain armed with staffs, the pilgrims... with their cockle-shells and staffs, the 'prentice bands of London with their cloth yards and their staffs, the merry men of Robin Hood with bows and quarter staffs, down to the present-day mountaineers, war-scouts, and explorers".

At the 3rd World Scout Jamboree in 1929, French Scouts constructed an  replica of the Eiffel Tower constructed entirely of lashed Scout staves.

In the United Kingdom, the cost and awkwardness of the staff meant that it became common for Scout Troops to hold a stock of staves in their meeting place, rather than have Scouts carry them about. The final blow came with the 1966 Advance Party Report, which recommended that "With the exception of a knife, no present optional items of uniform (e.g. staff, thumbstick, haversack.... ) may in future be worn".

Description
The official Policy, Organization and Rules of the Boy Scouts Association (UK) stipulated that the staff must be "Marked in feet and inches,   in length". Patrol Leaders carried a white pennant on their staves, showing a silhouette of their Patrol animal (each Patrol was named after an animal or bird). Modern commercially produced Scout staves are still available in the United Kingdom, generally made from coppice grown ash.

Uses
Some uses of 
the Scout staff that have been recommended by various Scouting publications:
 Making an improvised stretcher
 Holding back a crowd
 Jumping over a ditch (pole vault)
 Testing the depth of a river
 Helping another Scout over a high wall
 Construction of a light bridge, hut or flag staff
 Stopping a car by jamming a staff through the spokes of the wheel
 Self-defence
 A tent pole for a small tent
 Feeling your way over rough or marshy ground
 Measuring distances
 Estimating the height of trees or tall buildings
 Linking Scouts together on a night hike
 Making a splint for an injured leg
 Stopping an aggressive dog
 Beating out bush fires

References

Hiking equipment
Scouting uniform
Scoutcraft
Walking sticks